Ogier the Dane is a figure from medieval legend.

Ogier may also refer to:

Ogier de Busbecq, Austrian diplomat to the Ottoman Empire
Guillem Augier Novella, medieval troubadour
Ogier (law firm), a Jersey-based law firm
Ogier (Wheel of Time), a fictional race of non-human creatures in The Wheel of Time series
Hoger de Laon, music theorist and abbot

People with the surname
Barbara Ogier (1648–1720), Flemish playwright 
Bulle Ogier (born 1939), French film actor
Sébastien Ogier, French rally driver, eight-time World Rally Champion.